Mirosław Mścisz (born 14 July 1963) is a retired Polish football defender who played for Stal Stalowa Wola in Ekstraklasa.

Notes

References

External links
 

1963 births
Living people
Polish footballers
Association football defenders
Stal Stalowa Wola players
Ekstraklasa players
I liga players